Boyette: Not a Girl Yet is a 2020 Philippine comedy film starring Zaijian Jaranilla, Inigo Pascual and Maris Racal, directed by Jumbo Albano. The film is under Star Cinema. It is about a college student who will pretend to be a straight to get him closer to his crush. The film was released on KTX and iWantTFC as well as Sky Cable PPV and Cignal PPV on November 27, 2020.

Plot 
A college freshman Boyette (Zaijian Jaranilla) pretends to be straight to get closer to his homophobic crush Charles (Inigo Pascual), motivating himself to join a dance club. While he's pretending, a lot of girls like him, including Nancy (Maris Racal).

Cast 

 Zaijian Jaranilla as Boyette Camacho
 Maris Racal as Nancy
 Inigo Pascual as Charles
 Joey Marquez as Tatay Boy Camacho
 Alma Moreno as Nanay Suzette Camacho
 Jairus Aquino as Pia
 Dominic Ochoa as Alfred
 Ketchup Eusebio as Kuya Bitoy Camacho
 Mel Feliciano as Sir Cei
 Phi Palmos as Catriona
 Ji-An Lachica as Kylir
 Andre Garcia as Brett Camacho
 Christian Antolin as Baduding
 Lara Fortuna as Macy

Production 
Jaranilla said that Albano has convinced him because the character that Albano offered to him was so different from his role Santino on "May Bukas Pa" and to see him not just as Santino. He also said that he wants to show others that he can also portray other roles. Albano said that the film is inspired by his own story.

References

External links 
 

2020 films
2020 comedy films
Philippine LGBT-related films
2020 LGBT-related films
Philippine comedy films
Gay-related films